Søren Bobach (born 25 April 1989) is a Danish orienteering competitor, and world champion at both junior and senior level. He runs for OK Pan Århus.

He became Junior World Champion in the middle distance in Druskininkai in 2006, shared with Jan Beneš. He received a bronze medal in sprint in Gothenburg in 2008, behind Štěpán Kodeda and Johan Runesson, and a bronze medal in the middle distance.

He competed at the 2012 World Orienteering Championships. In the sprint competition, he qualified for the final, where he placed 9th.

Bobach won his first Men's World Championship medal at the 2014 World Orienteering Championships, winning the gold in the sprint. Bobach has since won two more gold medals in the Sprint Relay.

See also
 Danish orienteers
 List of orienteers
 List of orienteering events

References

External links

1989 births
Living people
Danish orienteers
Male orienteers
Foot orienteers
World Orienteering Championships medalists
Competitors at the 2017 World Games
Junior World Orienteering Championships medalists